The Men's Qatar Classic 2021 was the men's edition of the 2021 Qatar Classic squash tournament, which was a 2021–22 PSA World Tour Platinum event (prize money: $187,500). The event took place at the Khalifa International Tennis and Squash Complex in Doha, Qatar from 17 to 23 October.

Diego Elías of Peru won his first PSA World Tour Platinum event title, and became the first Peruvian to win a major event on the PSA World Tour after defeating New Zealand's Paul Coll in the final, winning in four games with a score of 13–11, 5–11, 13–11, 11–9.

Seeds

Draw and results

Semi finals and final

Main Draw

Top half

Bottom half

References

Men's Qatar Classic
Men's Qatar Classic (squash)
Squash tournaments in Qatar
Qatar Classic